Maria Vladimirovna Nikolaeva, also well known as Atma Ananda, Shanti Nathini, Dolma Jangkhu, Made Sri Nadi (born 8 July 1971, Saint Petersburg) is a prolific modern writer, philosophy master, and spiritual teacher. She is the author of 37 books printed in total run of 115 000 copies in Russian, translated into 6 foreign languages (English, Chinese, Indonesian, Estonian, Lithuanian, Ukrainian), and available worldwide via Amazon.com. Maria V. Nikolaeva is the member of 'International Writes Union', the 'Translators Union of Russia' (specialized in English), the fellow of academic 'Association for Study of Esoterics and Mysticism', and the honorable member of St. Petersburg Yoga School. She has lived and worked 12 years in 10 Asian countries, plus 1 year in 10 European countries.

Career 

According to the author's autobiography Out of Biography, published in USA, she started to write at the age of 4. She studied at Saint Petersburg State University, High School of Religion and Philosophy (Institute) , and Russian Christian Humanitarian Academy  getting three degrees in philosophy. Her academic work started from publishing 30 philosophical articles in different collections since 1996. The summary was collected by web-cathedra at the university.  She worked as an editor in three state institutions during 5 years until 2004. Initially, her 5 spiritual books were printed as a series by Piter in 2004. After her first success, she moved to India (visited many times since 1996) to continue her scientific research, publishing reports in several Russian Yoga magazines and many new books. The first academic edition of her book The Basic Hatha-Yoga Schools was printed by the publishing house 'Saint-Petersburg Oriental Studies' (Russian: «Петербургское востоковедение») , 2007 and reprinted by 'Tradition' (Moscow, 2014). It was presented by Russian Journal and the radio channel Moscow Echo . The first English edition of her book Hatha Yoga Practice: Disciple against Wall  (2007) was reviewed by Swami Dharmananda (India) and Dr. David Frawley (USA) and distributed by Amazon.com. Her books have been translated to Eastern European languages - Lithuanian , Estonian , and Ukrainian since 2008. She traveled broadly in 10 Asian countries (India, Nepal, Sri Lanka, Thailand, China, Laos, Vietnam, Cambodia, Malaysia, and Indonesia) in 2007–2009. After she settled down in Bali in 2009, she concentrated on her holistic spiritual teaching according to her later book Self-Being Strategy consulting her readers till the end 2013. In this period she published her articles in monthly local magazines 'Ubud Community' [12] and 'Sanur Community', got translated her books to Indonesian and Chinese while her English books reached the number of 10, and start spreading all her e-books in the biggest Russian system 'LitRes'. Since beginning 2014 she came back to her home-town St. Petersburg to teach Eastern knowledge for Western auditorium. She got published the collection of her works in 5 volumes by 'Tradition' Publishing Group (Moscow) [13], becoming the member of 'The International Writers Union' [14] and 'The Translators Union of Russia' [15]. She continues her teaching in above 30 spiritual and training centers, being the honorable member of St. Petersburg Yoga School [16]. Developing her new project The East to the West she spent in total 1 year in 10 European countries (Finland, Norway, Germany, Greece, France, Monaco, Italy, Vatican, Austria, Portugal), also giving interview to different European mass-media, and got published her philosophic book by 'Lambert' Academic Publishing in Germany (Berlin, 2016) [18]. She continue her work according to requests from many organisations worldwide.

Selected works

Books published in Europe 
 Shanti Nathini. Moters Dao praktikos. Pasirengimo periodas. Vilnius, 2008.
 Shanti Nathini. Joogateraapia nägemise taastamiseks. Tallinn, 2009.
 М.В. Николаева. Понятие "Мы" и суждение "Нашей" воли. Berlin, 2016.

Bestsellers printed in Russia 
 Мария Николаева. Основные школы хатха-йоги. Moscow, 2014 (St.Petersburg, 2007).
 Мария Николаева. Рамана Махарши. Через три смерти. Moscow, 2014, 2008 (St.Petersburg, 2005).
 Мария Николаева. Свами Вивекананда. Вибрации высокой частоты. Moscow, 2014, 2007 (St.Petersburg, 2005).
 Мария Николаева. Панчатантра: Индийская стратегия успеха. Moscow, 2014, 2009; 2007 (St.Petersburg, 2005).
 Мария Николаева. Хитопадеша: Парадоксы взаимности. Moscow, 2014, 2009; 2007.
 Мария Николаева. Травы для йоги и аюрведы. Moscow, 2014, 2008, 2006.
 Мария Николаева. Йога прозрения. Moscow, 2015 (St.Petersburg, 2009; 2008; 2006).
 Мария Николаева Практика хатха-йоги. Ученик перед стеной. Moscow, 2005.
 Мария Николаева. Фэн-шуй. Растения в вашем доме. St.Petersburg, 2004.

References 
 Maria Nikolaeva's photo among guests in Baltasar Dias Theatre by DNOTICIAS.PT (Madeira, 2016)
 Interview with Maria Nikolaeva  by Dmitry Tyotkin in Information Agency 'REGNUM' (Moscow, 2016)
 Interview with Maria Nikolaeva on her book published in 'Lambert'  by 'Omni Scriptum' (Berlin, 2016)
 Interview with Maria Nikolaeva about Rome by Anastasia Gulyaeva in BALTNEWS.EE (Tallinn, 2015)
 Interview with Maria Nikolaeva about France by Natalia Nikolaenko for 'Tradition' (Moscow, 2015)
 Interview with Maria Nikolaeva about Greece by Arkady Beinenson in 'Russian Athens' (Greece, 2015)
 Interview with Maria Nikolaeva by Alexandra Dobryanskaya for 'Theory and Practice' (Moscow, 2014)
 Interview with Maria Nikolaeva about Russia by Nikolay Mariin for 'Window to Russia' (Moscow, 2014)
 Report ‘The Realm of Maria Nikolaeva’  by Aloke Mukerjee in 'CNN International' (USA, New York, 2011)
 Review of book 'Karma Mastery' by Atma Ananda in July issue of 'Astrological Magazine' (India, Bangalor, 2011)
 Interview with Maria Nikolaeva about Bali by Olesya Novikova for 'YaTuristka' (Moscow, 2011)
 Maria Nikolaeva's presentation in 'Balinese Cultural Creation' (Indonesia, 2010)
 Maria Nikolaeva's visit in Chandi Buddha News & Photos (Indonesia, 2009)
 Maria Nikolaeva's presentation in ‘Russian Journal’ (Culture, Moscow, 2007)
 Maria Nikolaeva's acting in film 'India Trip' by Lev Victorov (India, Varanasi, 2007)

External links
 The author’s official web-site
 The author's page in International Writers Union
 The author's page in St. Petersburg State University
 The author's page in St. Petersburg Yoga School

1971 births
Living people
Writers from Saint Petersburg
Russian women writers